James Albert Adair (born September 29, 1948) is a Canadian retired professional ice hockey player who played in the World Hockey Association (WHA).

He appeared in 70 WHA games, recording 12 goal and 17 assists, along with 10 penalty minutes.

Career statistics

References

External links

1948 births
Living people
Canadian ice hockey centres
Fort Worth Wings players
Hamilton Red Wings (OHA) players
Ice hockey people from Ontario
Johnstown Jets players
Oklahoma City Blazers (1965–1977) players
Sportspeople from Brockville
Tulsa Oilers (1964–1984) players
Vancouver Blazers players
Vancouver Canucks (WHL) players
Canadian expatriate ice hockey players in the United States